The Honda CR series is a range of off-road motorcycles made by the Honda corporation from 1973 onwards.

CR60R

The CR60R was produced in 1983 and 1984. The CR60R had an air-cooled two-stroke engine, and featured the Honda ProLink rear suspension system.

CR80R 
The CR80 was manufactured between 1980 and 2002 by Honda. It was changed in 2003 to the Honda CR85R and subsequently to the Honda CRF150.
Several changes were made throughout the years from being air-cooled to water-cooled and
different styling each year. The CR80R Expert started production in 1996. The machine was powered by a 2-stroke engine and utilised a 6-speed manual transmission.

CR125 

Honda launched the CR125M in 1973, branded as the "20 Horsepower Feather". Offered at a low price of $749, it had a top speed of 60 mph and was equipped with a two-stroke  air cooled motor.  It was a very popular motorcycle, and it dominated motocross for a while.

In, 1978 Honda launched the CR125 Red Rocket Elsinore; a rare bike very well built equipped with a 6-speed transmission, it can be recognized by the expansion chamber on the front of the cylinder where the exhaust is to be attached.

CR250 

The CR250M Elsinore began selling in 1973. It had a two-stroke engine and was one of the first of its class, and set the standard for two-stroke motorcycle development. In 1974 and 1975, the CR250M design changed little. In 1978, Honda revised the CR250M and renamed it the CR250R, the R standing for race. In 1981, Honda introduced a new suspension. The 1984 model had a new hydraulic front disc brake, and a new exhaust valve. Between then and 1990 the CR250R had minor changes such as hydraulic rear brake, Showa front suspension, and a bigger carburetor.

In 1992, the CR250R was given a newer, more aggressive design, but a disadvantage was the amount of power the new engines were producing in relation to the weak steel frame. Many riders advised Honda to change the frame to something stronger; but successful riders who were sponsored by Honda such as Jeremy McGrath and Ronnie Mac only the screaming eagle preferred the old stiff weak frame. In 1997, the aluminum frame was introduced. Many racers liked this frame but the bike was not selling to casual desert riders, so Honda undertook a redesign and in 2000 introduced an improved aluminum frame. In 2002, the only real change was the bike was made faster and lighter and the electronic power valve and third-generation aluminum frame. The Honda CR250 had a  liquid-cooled single-cylinder engine that produced about 45 hp. It had a five-speed transmission with Showa suspension and a two-gallon fuel tank. In 2007, Honda announced that they would produce no more two-strokes after that year.

CRM 250
The CRM 250 was a 2 stroke trail bike made from 1989 to 1999.

Model history
 CRM250 Mk1 1989–1990
 CRM250 Mk2 & 2.2 1991–1993
 CRM250 Mk3 1994–1996
 CRM250 AR 1996–1999

CR450R

The CR450R was produced in 1981. The CR450R had an air-cooled two-cycle engine with a 4-speed transmission, and featured the ProLink rear suspension system.

CR480R

The CR480R was produced in 1982-83. The CR480R had an air-cooled two-cycle engine with a 4-speed transmission for 1982, and a 5- speed transmission for 1983. Both years featured the ProLink rear suspension system. In addition to the extra gear, 1983 saw several major changes from the 1982 model,  and although they appear similar, virtually no parts interchange. 1983 bikes had an aluminum rear suspension link vs. cast iron, revised gas tank and seat, aluminum rear brake trailing arm, bolt-on rear subframe, and dampening adjustments for the rear shock.

CR500 

The CR500 was first produced in 1984, and had a  air-cooled two-stroke engine (1984) that produced 60.8hp, the most powerful motocross bike that Honda had ever produced. The CR500 raced in long desert rallies like the Baja 500 and the Baja 1000. The CR500 was discontinued in 2002 in Australia, and replaced by the four-stroke CRF450.  Although the CRF450 was slightly heavier than the CR500 it had a modern twin-spar aluminium frame.

The 1985 CR500 was the first year being water-cooled.

References 

CR Series
Two-stroke motorcycles
Motorcycles introduced in 1973
Off-road motorcycles